Events from the year 1675 in Sweden

Incumbents
 Monarch – Charles XI

Events

 War between Sweden and the Netherlands. 
 The King is engaged to Ulrika Eleonora of Denmark.
 June 18 - Battle of Fehrbellin
 War between Sweden and the Holy Roman Empire. 
 Scanian War
 Coronation of the King. 
 The King retracts the Court leet of the nobility. 
 Law on the right to draft Romani males to military service. 
 June - 71 people are executed in the Torsåker witch trials, the biggest witch trial in the history of the country.

Births

 January 27 - Erik Benzelius the younger, librarian, theologian and bishop (died 1743)

Deaths

 Margareta Beijer, managing director of the Swedish Post Office, Postverket from 1669 until 1673 (born 1625) 
 Gertrud Svensdotter, notorious witch witness  (born 1656) 
 Brita Rosladin  (born 1626)

References

 
Years of the 17th century in Sweden
Sweden